The Rio Ivinhema State Park is a State park in the state of Mato Grosso do Sul, Brazil.

Location

The Rio Ivinhema State Park is divided between the municipalities of Jateí (57.46%), Naviraí (21.36%) and Taquarussu (21.18%) in Mato Grosso do Sul.
It is the largest park created by the CESP (Companhia Energética de São Paulo) for environmental compensation.
The várzea and associated ecosystems of the Ivinhema River in the Paraná River basin is the last free and representative stretch of this type of environment.
The park also holds fragments of seasonal semi-deciduous Atlantic Forest.

The park would be part of the proposed Trinational Biodiversity Corridor, which aims to provide forest connections between conservation units in Brazil, Paraguay and Argentina in the Upper Paraná ecoregion.

History

The Rio Ivinhema State Park was created by state decree 9.278 of 17 December 1998 with the objective of preserving biological diversity, protection the natural heritage and culture of the region with its flora, fauna, landscapes and other natural resources, for the purposes of scientific research, recreation and environmental education in contact with nature.
The consultative council was appointed on 4 June 2002.

Notes

Sources

State parks of Brazil
Protected areas of  Mato Grosso do Sul
1998 establishments in Brazil
Protected areas of the Atlantic Forest